Heinz Hölscher (1925 – 7 May 2021) was a German cinematographer.

Selected filmography
 Two People (1952)
 Sarajevo (1955)
 I Know What I'm Living For (1955)
 Rübezahl (1957)
 The Blue Sea and You (1959)
 A Thousand Stars Aglitter (1959)
 Nick Knatterton’s Adventure (1959)
 Brandenburg Division (1960)
 I Learned That in Paris (1960)
 Two Among Millions (1961)
 The Green Archer (1961)
 Her Most Beautiful Day (1962)
 Only a Woman (1962)
 The Oil Prince (1965)
 Maigret and His Greatest Case (1966)
 Winnetou and the Crossbreed (1966)
 Morning's at Seven (1968)
 Dead Body on Broadway (1969)
 Hotel by the Hour (1970)
 When the Mad Aunts Arrive (1970)
 Student of the Bedroom (1970)
 Who Laughs Last, Laughs Best (1971)
 The Mad Aunts Strike Out (1971)
 The Reverend Turns a Blind Eye (1971)
 Aunt Trude from Buxtehude (1971)
 Don't Get Angry (1972)
 Always Trouble with the Reverend (1972)
My Daughter, Your Daughter (1972)
 Crazy – Completely Mad (1973)
 Blue Blooms the Gentian (1973)
 The Bloody Vultures of Alaska (1973)
 Alpine Glow in Dirndlrock (1974)
 No Sin on the Alpine Pastures (1974)
 Naked Massacre (1976)
 Everyone Dies Alone (1976)
 The Man in Pyjamas (1981)
 Starke Zeiten (1988)

References

Bibliography 
 Bergfelder, Tim. International Adventures: German Popular Cinema and European Co-Productions in the 1960s. Berghahn Books, 2005.

External links 
 

1925 births
2021 deaths
German cinematographers
Film people from Munich